Mount St John is an industrial suburb of Townsville in the City of Townsville, Queensland, Australia. In the  Mount St John had a population of 62 people.

Geography 

The land use is predominantly industrial with the eastern corner of the suburb being part of the Townsville International Airport (which is mostly in neighbouring Garbutt). There is no access from Mount St John into the airport.

There is no residential subdivision within the locality, but there is the Coral Coast Tourist Park at 547 Ingham Road.

History
Mount St John is situated in the traditional Wulgurukaba Aboriginal country.

The suburb was named after St John Robinson who founded zoological gardens in the area.

The top of the mountain Mount St John was the site of the Mount St John Anti-Aircraft Battery during World War II. In 2016 the battery's remains were incorporated as a feature of the landscaped garden of a private residence.

In the  Mount St John had a population of 62 people.

Heritage listings
Mount St John has a number of heritage-listed sites, including:
 43 Toll Street: Mount St John Anti-Aircraft Battery

Education 
North Trade Training Centre is a technical college of TAFE Queensland at 763-773 Ingham Road.

There are no schools in the suburb. The nearest schools are Garbutt State School in neighbouring Garbutt to the east and Bohlevale State School in Burdell to the west. The nearest secondary school is Heatley State College in Heatley to the south.

Facilities 
Mount St John Wastewater Treatment Plant is a sewage treatment plant in Mount St John Road. It is operated by the Townsville City Council. It processes  of waste water each day and operates continuously through the year. It services the suburbs of Kirwan, the Upper Ross River area, the Northern Beaches, and parts of Garbutt and Currajong. The treated water is then used to irrigate the Rowes Bay golf course or is discharged into Snaggy Creek, a tributary of the Bohle River.

References

Suburbs of Townsville